Pandanus grayorum is a plant in the family Pandanaceae which is endemic to a very small area of northeast Queensland. It is closely related to both Pandanus gemmifer and Pandanus solms-laubachii, and it coexists with the latter.

Description
Like P. gemmifer the stem is marked with spirally arranged nodules, and there are numerous "pups" or plantlets on the branches. Small spurs occur along the leaf margins and midrib.

The inflorescence is terminal and pendant, occurring from mid-spring to mid-summer. Fruit mature over a period of almost 12 months, ripening around the same time as the next season's flowers appear. The tree can also reproduce by means of the "pups", which detach and fall to the ground and can grow into a new plant beneath the parent.

Taxonomy
This species was first described in 2020 by Martin Wilhelm Callmander, Sven Buerki, Frank Zich, Ashley R. Field and Timothy Gallaher. Their paper, titled , was published in June 2021 in the journal Australian Systematic Botany.

Etymology
The species epithet grayorum was chosen by the authors to honour the Australian botanist Bruce Gray, who spent many years working in North Queensland, on his 80th birthday.

Distribution and habitat
Pandanus grayorum has a very limited distribution, occurring in lowland rainforest and mangrove forest margins in close proximity to the Russell, Mulgrave, Johnstone, Alice, and Moresby rivers in the coastal area between Cairns and Silkwood.

Conservation
This species is listed by the Queensland Department of Environment and Science as least concern. , it has not been assessed by the IUCN.

The authors suggest in their paper that the species be given a status of vulnerable, due to the fact that most collections of it are from outside protected areas, and the areas adjacent to occurrences are mostly agricultural which are potentially subject to clearing.

Gallery

References

External links
 
 
 View a map of historical sightings of this species at the Australasian Virtual Herbarium
 View observations of this species on iNaturalist
 View images of this species on Flickriver

grayorum
Endemic flora of Queensland

Plants described in 2021